The NeXTcube is a high-end workstation computer developed, manufactured, and sold by NeXT from 1990 until 1993. It superseded the original NeXT Computer workstation and is housed in a similar cube-shaped magnesium enclosure, designed by frog design. The workstation runs the NeXTSTEP operating system and was launched with a  list price.

Hardware 
The NeXTcube is the successor to the original NeXT Computer. It differs from its predecessor in having a 68040 processor, a hard disk in place of the magneto-optical drive, and a floppy disk drive. A 33 MHz NeXTcube Turbo was later produced.

NeXT released the NeXTdimension for the NeXTcube, a circuit board based on an Intel i860 processor, which offers 32-bit PostScript color display and video-sampling features.

The Pyro accelerator board increases the speed of a NeXTcube by replacing the standard 25 MHz processor with a 50 MHz one.

Specifications

 
 Display: 1120×832 17 in (432 mm) 82 ppi grayscale MegaPixel Display
 Operating System: NeXTSTEP 2.2 Extended or later
 CPU: 25 MHz 68040 with integrated floating-point unit
 Digital Signal Processor: 25 MHz Motorola DSP56001
 RAM: 8 MB, expandable to 64 MB (Sixteen 30-pin SIMM slots)
 Floppy Drive: 2.88 MB
 Hard Drive: 105 MB, 340 MB, 400 MB, 660 MB, 1.4 GB or 2.8 GB SCSI drive
 Network interface: 10BASE-T and 10BASE2 Ethernet
 Expansion: four NeXTbus slots (mainboard uses one slot)
 Size (H × W × D): 12 in × 12 in × 12 in (305 mm x 305 mm x 305 mm (±1 mm))

See also 
 NeXT character set
 NeXT Computer
 NeXTcube Turbo
 NeXTstation
 Power Mac G4 Cube, a similar cube computer from Apple.

References

External links 

 

Computer workstations
NeXT
History of the Internet
Steve Jobs
68k-based computers